Raphaël Pichon (born in 1984 in Paris) is a French countertenor, choral and orchestral conductor.

Biography 
Raphaël Pichon was a member of the Maîtrise des Petits chanteurs de Versailles during his childhood. He then studied violin and piano at the  before joining the Conservatoire de Paris, where he studied singing and conducting. First of all a countertenor, he sang under the direction of Ton Koopman, Jordi Savall, Gustav Leonhardt, Laurence Equilbey, Paul Agnew, Jean Tubéry, Vincent Dumestre, Bruno Boterf, Michel Laplénie and Sébastien d'Hérin.

In 2006, during his studies at the Paris Conservatory, Raphaël Pichon created the "ensemble Pygmalion", dedicated to the repertoire on period instruments. Very quickly, their recordings received a very favourable reception from the critics: an album of mass compositions by Johann Sebastian Bach (Missæ Breves, BWV 234 and 235) in 2008, was awarded a golden Diapason, and an Editor's Choice of the British magazine Gramophone. In September 2012, their third album, Missa, a recording of the first version of the Mass in B minor by Bach was rewarded by the magazine Télérama.

Raphaël Pichon has also directed the chamber choir "OTrente", turned towards the romantic and contemporary repertoire.

Opera
A recording of Dardanus by Jean-Philippe Rameau appeared in 2013.
In 2015, appeared a live recording of Rameau's Castor et Pollux. Also in 2015 Pygmalion performed Dardanus at the Opéra de Bordeaux in a staged production by Michel Fau.

References

External links 
 Portrait of Raphaël Pichon on Télérama
 Raphaël Pichon : sacré chef d’orchestre ! on Télérama
 Raphaël Pichon on Rayfieldallied.com
 Raphaël Pichon : La musique classique n'a rien de raisonnable on Télérama

1984 births
Musicians from Paris
Living people
Conservatoire de Paris alumni
French countertenors
French choral conductors
French male conductors (music)
French performers of early music
Founders of early music ensembles
21st-century French singers
21st-century French conductors (music)
21st-century French male singers
Harmonia Mundi artists